The 1961 Detroit Titans football team represented the University of Detroit as an independent during the 1961 NCAA University Division football season. In their third and final year under head coach Jim Miller, the Titans compiled a 5–6 record and were outscored by a combined total of 181 to 173.

The team's statistical leaders included Jerry Gross with 1,126 passing yards, Vic Battani with 358 rushing yards, and Larry Vargo with 601 receiving yards and 48 points scored.

Schedule

See also
 1961 in Michigan

References

External links
 1961 University of Detroit football programs

Detroit
Detroit Titans football seasons
Detroit Titans football
Detroit Titans football